Rashad Spain (born October 8, 1993), known professionally as Saucy Santana, is an American rapper. After beginning his career as a makeup artist for the hip hop duo City Girls, he started rapping in February 2019, and released his debut single "Walk Em Like A Dog" that same year. After becoming a recurring guest on the reality television franchise Love & Hip Hop: Miami, Santana gained further prominence in 2021 when his singles "Walk", and "Here We Go" spawned viral challenges on TikTok. That same year, he released the song "Material Girl", and later released the song's remix "Material Gworrllllllll!" alongside Madonna.

Early life 
Santana was born to Teresa Harris on October 8, 1993. He grew up in Bridgeport, Connecticut, before moving to Florida when he was 10 years old. Santana is of Afro-Dominican descent through his grandmother. He started his career in the music industry by working as a makeup artist for City Girls, and started rapping in February 2019 when he created a theme song for the podcast that he hosted with his friends at the time.

Career 
Santana uploaded his debut single "Walk 'Em Like a Dog" to the audio distribution platform SoundCloud in August 2019. This release was followed by his debut EP, Dog Walkers, in September 2019, and then the mixtape Imma Celebrity in January 2020. Santana featured as a recurring guest on the third season of the reality television franchise Love & Hip Hop: Miami, which aired on VH1 from January 6, 2020, to April 6, 2020. In July 2020, Santana released his second mixtape Pretty Little Gangsta, bolstered by the singles "Up & Down" featuring American rapper Latto, and "Back It Up" featuring American rapper LightSkinKeisha. Santana featured on American rapper Sukihana's single "Food Stamp Hoe" in August 2021. His 2020 single "Walk" went viral in 2021 after being used for the popular TikTok #WalkChallenge, and earned him a cosign from American rapper Nicki Minaj. His singles "Here We Go" and "Material Girl" also gained prominence on the platform throughout the year; the latter of which received a cosign from Madonna, who performed a medley of both her song "Material Girl" and Santana's "Material Girl" with him at NYC Pride in 2022. They would later release the version they performed as a single, entitled "Material Gworrllllllll!" His debut studio album Keep It Playa was released on December 16, 2021, and featured the single "Shisha", his first collaboration with City Girls, with whom he originally began his career as a makeup artist.

In June 2022, Santana received widespread backlash for tweets from 2014 about singer Beyoncé's daughter, Blue Ivy Carter, after Santana claimed to have compared her to Kanye West's daughter North West, and calling Carter's hair, "nappy".

In August 2022, Santana made his debut on The Tonight Show, performing "Booty". Santana also performed "Booty" at the 2022 MTV Video Music Awards "Pre-Show".

Artistry 

Santana has cited Gucci Mane, Trina, and Tampa Tony as influences.

Personal life 
Santana came out as gay at age 17.

On December 11, 2019, Santana and two others were shot in a drive-by shooting in Miami. Santana, who was hospitalized for his injuries, stated that he believes the shooting was motivated by homophobia. He said of the shooting, "I got shot in the top of my shoulder, you was aiming at my face or at my head, that's an instant kill." This incident inspired him to write the song "You Can't Kill Me".

Selected discography

Studio albums

Mixtapes

Extended plays

Singles

As lead artist

As featured artist

Awards and nominations

Results

References 

Living people
African-American rappers
LGBT rappers
Participants in American reality television series
21st-century American rappers
LGBT people from Florida
1993 births
American gay musicians
21st-century African-American musicians
American shooting survivors
LGBT African Americans
People from Perry, Florida
Rappers from Florida
Rappers from Connecticut
Musicians from Bridgeport, Connecticut
Southern hip hop musicians